Alpha Tower is a Grade II listed office skyscraper in Birmingham, England. It was designed by the Birmingham-born architect George Marsh of Richard Seifert & Partners as the headquarters of the commercial television company ATV (Associated Television) and part of the company's production studio complex known as ATV Centre, an adjacent shorter tower was planned but was never built. ATV closed in 1982, after which the building became offices. 

At , as of 2023 it is the sixth-tallest building in Birmingham, and became the second-tallest office building in Birmingham after 103 Colmore Row was topped out in 2020.

Building and architecture
It is a Grade A locally listed building. It was nominated for listed building status by the Twentieth Century Society in 2002, although the owners applied for a Certificate of Immunity from Listing. However, English Heritage added Alpha Tower to The National Heritage List for England on 31 July 2014.

According to English Heritage:

Ownership

Arena Central Developments sold the building to Catalyst's European Property Fund in 2008 for £42.5 million. Birmingham City Council left tenancy in 2010 leaving the building 77% void. Nationwide Building Society put the building into receivership in 2012 and put it on the market for £10.25 million in 2013.

The building was bought for £14 million in February 2014 by Anglo Scandinavian Estates Group who are set to invest £9 million in a refurbishment of the building.

Occupancy
Birmingham City Council took a large tenancy of the building until they vacated in 2010.

In popular culture
The tower featured in the Cliff Richard film Take Me High (1973) for both exterior and interior shots.

References

External links

BirminghamUK.com
Skyscrapernews.com's entry

Office buildings completed in 1973
Skyscrapers in Birmingham, West Midlands
ITV offices, studios and buildings
Grade II listed buildings in Birmingham
Skyscraper office buildings in England